Anthony "Tony" John Crudo (born March 25, 1959 in Seattle, Washington) is a former U.S. soccer defender who spent five seasons in the North American Soccer League.  He also earned seven caps with the U.S. national team between 1979 and 1982.

Youth
In 1968 played for Federal Way Boys Club.  In 1969 moved to Shoreline and played for Lake City Blue Barons (coached by his dad Ray Crudo). Crudo attended Shorecrest High School in Shoreline, Washington, where he was a member of the school's 1976 state championship soccer team.

NASL
Crudo signed with the Tampa Bay Rowdies of the North American Soccer League (NASL) in the fall of 1977.  He saw no regular-season outdoor games that year, but did play in an exhibition game against China on October 13, 1977.  In 1979, he played the first seven games of the season in Tampa Bay before being traded to the California Surf in July.  During the 1980–81 NASL indoor season, Crudo played 13 games. He continued with the Surf until the end of 1981 when the Surf folded.  In October 1981, the Seattle Sounders purchased his contract.  He played only three games during the 1982 season.  He left the NASL at the end of the season.

National team
Crudo played seven times with the U.S. national team between 1979 and 1982.  His first caps came in a 6-0 loss to France on May 2, 1979.  He played on World Cup qualifier, a loss to Canada on November 1, 1980.  His last game with the national team came on March 21, 1982, a victory over Trinidad and Tobago.

Coaching
Crudo continues to live in Washington where he is a special education teacher, the boys and girls soccer coach at Fife High School, and the Girls Sparta 99 coach.

References

External links
 NASL stats

1959 births
Living people
American soccer players
California Surf players
North American Soccer League (1968–1984) indoor players
North American Soccer League (1968–1984) players
Tampa Bay Rowdies (1975–1993) players
Seattle Sounders (1974–1983) players
United States men's international soccer players
People from Shoreline, Washington
Soccer players from Washington (state)
Sportspeople from King County, Washington
Association football defenders